Determination is the second full-length studio album by the New Jersey heavy metal quintet God Forbid. It was released on April 17, 2001, through Century Media Records. The album was reissued on Vinyl in 2021 to celebrate the album’s twentieth anniversary.

Track listing

Personnel
 Byron Davis – lead vocals
 Doc Coyle – lead guitar
 Dallas Coyle – rhythm guitar
 John "Beeker" Outcalt – bass guitar
 Corey Pierce – drums

References

2001 albums
God Forbid albums
Century Media Records albums